The American soap opera Passions has been honored with numerous awards and nominations during its run:

American Latino Media Arts Awards (ALMA Awards)

Casting Society of America Artios Awards

Daytime Emmy Awards

GLAAD Media Awards

Hollywood Makeup Artist and Hair Stylist Guild Awards

NAACP Image Awards

Soap Opera Digest Awards

Imagen Foundation Awards

References

External links
Passions awards - IMDb.com

Passions
Passions